Caspar René Gregory (November 6, 1846 – April 9, 1917) was an American-born German theologian.

Life
Gregory was born to Mary Jones and Henry Duval Gregory in Philadelphia. He was the brother of the American zoologist Emily Ray Gregory. In 1873, he decided to continue his studies at the University of Leipzig under Constantin von Tischendorf, to whose work on textual criticism of the New Testament he had been referred by his teacher Ezra Abbot. He administered the scientific legacy of Tischendorf, who died in 1874, and continued his work.

In 1876, he obtained his PhD with a dissertation titled Grégoire the priest and the revolutionist. The first examiner for it was the historian Georg Voigt.

He completed his post-doctoral work in Leipzig in 1884, and became an associate professor in 1889 and a full honorary professor in 1891.  He apparently had several doctorates:  Karl Josef Friedrich (p. 130) even mentions five doctorates in his biography of Gregory.  At least one doctorate in theology obtained in Leipzig in 1889 is attested. In June 1901, he received an honorary doctorate of Divinity from the University of Glasgow.

On 11 August 1914, Gregory, who had been a citizen of Saxony since 1881, enlisted in the German Army as its oldest wartime volunteer. He became a second lieutenant in November 1916 and fell in 1917 on the western front.  He died on April 9, 1917, in a field hospital in Neufchâtel-sur-Aisne, France.

Gregory specialized in New Testament textual criticism. He organized biblical manuscripts into a classification system (Die griechischen Handschriften des Neuen Testaments, 1908) which continues to be in use throughout the scholarly world today. He is also credited with being the first to notice the consistent medieval practice (called Gregory's Law or Gregory's Rule) of collating parchment leaves so that grain side faced grain side and flesh side flesh side. He was also interested in biblical canon.

Works

Books
 {{cite book|author1-last=Gregory |author1-first=Caspar René |title=Prolegomena zu Tischendorfs Novum Testamentum Graece (editio VIII. critica major), 2 Vols. |date=1884–1894 }}
 
 
 
 
 
 
 
 

Journal articles
 

 References 

 Literature 
 .
 
 Karl Josef Friedrich, Caspar Rene Gregory, in: Sächsische Lebensbilder, Vol. I, Dresden 1930, p. 125-131. 
 Ernst Jünger, ed. (1928), "Caspar René Gregory", in: Die Unvergessenen. Berlin: Andermann. p. 111 ff. 
 Bruno Hartung (1929), "Caspar René Gregory", in: Das Jahr des Herrn: Kalender für die evangelischen Gemeinden Leipzigs''. 5. Jg., p. 36-38.

External links 
 From the Papers of Caspar René Gregory. In "Of the Incomparable Treasure of the Holy Scriptures: An Exhibit of Historic Bible-related Materials from the Collection of the Harvard Divinity School Library," October 1998
 
 Biographical sketch in The Biblical World, Vol. 38 (1911), pp. 350-354
 Gregory's obituary in the New York Times

1846 births
1917 deaths
19th-century German Protestant theologians
20th-century German Protestant theologians
19th-century male writers
American biblical scholars
American Christian theologians
American emigrants to Germany
German biblical scholars
German male non-fiction writers
German military personnel killed in World War I
German papyrologists
Leipzig University alumni
New Testament scholars
Princeton Theological Seminary alumni
University of Pennsylvania alumni
Writers from Philadelphia